Tan-Shapur was a Sasanian nobleman who served as Marzban of Persian Armenia from 552/554 to 560.

Biography 
Little is known about Tan-Shapur. René Grousset said he governed Persian Armenia from 554 to 560. Cyril Toumanoff, however, says that Tan-Shapur's governorship of Persian Armenia lasted from 552 to 560. Stepanos Asoghik, an Armenian historian who lived in the 11th century, said that Tan-Shapur went proselytizing Zoroastrianism in Persian Armenia, where many Christians preferred to die instead of converting. However, it was during his governorship that the Armenian Apostolic Church organized the Second Council of Dvin. In 560, Tan-Shapur was replaced by Varazdat as Marzban of Persian Armenia.

References

Sources
 
 
 
 
 

6th-century Iranian people
Sasanian governors of Armenia
Year of birth unknown